Guo Hong, is a former goaltender for the China women's national ice hockey team. She was nicknamed The Great Wall of China for her talent in net, often making over 50 saves a game, and has been recognised as one of the best Chinese hockey players in history.

Career 

Hong has represented the China women's national ice hockey team for over ten years. She would lead the team to 4th place finishes in the 1994 and 1997 IIHF Women's World Championships.

The 1996 Pacific Rim Tournament showcased one of the best games of her career. In a game against the Canadian National Women’s Team, Hong stopped 38 of 39 shots in a 1–0 loss.

At the 1998 Winter Olympics, she would lead the team to a 4th place finish, losing in the bronze medal game to Finland. At the 2002 Winter Olympics, she registered a save percentage of 88.79 save percentage. She led all goaltenders at the event in saves and shots against.

She would retire in 2004 due to persistent back injuries.

Career stats

Olympics

References

1973 births
Chinese women's ice hockey goaltenders
Ice hockey players at the 1998 Winter Olympics
Ice hockey players at the 2002 Winter Olympics
Living people
Olympic ice hockey players of China
Sportspeople from Heilongjiang
Asian Games gold medalists for China
Ice hockey players at the 1999 Asian Winter Games
Medalists at the 1999 Asian Winter Games
Asian Games medalists in ice hockey
21st-century Chinese women